Wildersville is an unincorporated community in Henderson County, Tennessee, United States. The zipcode is 38388.

Demographics

Notes

Unincorporated communities in Henderson County, Tennessee
Unincorporated communities in Tennessee